Problematic internet use or pathological internet use is generally defined as problematic, compulsive use of the internet, that results in significant impairment in an individual's function in various life domains over a prolonged period of time. Young people are at particular risk of developing internet addiction disorder, with case studies highlighting students whose academic performance plummets as they spend more and more time online. Some also experience health consequences from loss of sleep, as they stay up later and later to chat online, check for social network status updates or to further progress in a game.

Excessive Internet use has not been recognized as a disorder by the World Health Organization, the Diagnostic and Statistical Manual of Mental Disorders (DSM-5) or the International Classification of Diseases (ICD-11). However, the diagnosis of gaming disorder has been included in the ICD-11. Controversy around the diagnosis includes whether the disorder is a separate clinical entity, or a manifestation of underlying psychiatric disorders. Research has approached the question from a variety of viewpoints, with no universally standardized or agreed definitions, leading to difficulties in developing evidence based recommendations.

As adolescents (12–19 years) and emerging adults (20–29 years) access the Internet more than any other age groups and undertake a higher risk of overuse of the Internet, the problem of Internet behavior disorder is most relevant to young people.

Consequences

Mental health consequences 
A longitudinal study of Chinese high school students (2010) suggests that individuals with moderate to severe risk of Internet addiction are 2.5 times more likely to develop depressive symptoms than their IAD-free counterparts. Researchers studied pathological or uncontrolled Internet use, and later mental health problems in one thousand and forty-one teenage students in China. The students were free of depression and anxiety at the start of the study. Nine months later, the youngsters were evaluated again for anxiety and depression, and eighty-seven were judged as having developed depression. Eight reported significant anxiety symptoms. Another longitudinal study of high school students from Helsinki found that problematic internet usage and depressive symptoms may produce a positive feedback loop. Problematic internet usage is also associated with increased risk of substance abuse.

Social consequences 
Internet addiction increases the risk of many negative social and health outcomes, including poor academic performance, harmful personality effects, anxiety and depression. 

The best-documented evidence of Internet addiction so far is time-disruption, which subsequently results in interference with regular social life, including academic, professional performance and daily routines. Some studies also reveal that IAD can lead to disruption of social relationships in Europe and Taiwan. It is, however, also noted by others that IAD is beneficial for peer relations in Taiwan.

Dr. Keith W. Beard (2005) states that "an individual is addicted when an individual's psychological state, which includes both mental and emotional states, as well as their scholastic, occupational and social interactions, is impaired by the overuse of [Internet]".

As a result of its complex nature, some scholars do not provide a definition of Internet addiction disorder and throughout time, different terms are used to describe the same phenomenon of excessive Internet use. Internet addiction disorder is used interchangeably with problematic Internet use, pathological Internet use, and Internet addictive disorder. In some cases, this behavior is also referred to as Internet overuse, problematic computer use, compulsive Internet use, Internet abuse, harmful use of the Internet, and Internet dependency.

Signs and symptoms

Physical symptoms 
Physical symptoms include a weakened immune system due to lack of sleep, loss of exercise, and increased risk for carpal tunnel syndrome and eye and back strain.

Symptoms of withdrawal might include agitation, depression, anger and anxiety when the person is away from technology. These psychological symptoms might even turn into physical symptoms such as rapid heartbeat, tense shoulders and shortness of breath.

Related disorders

Problem gambling (online gambling disorder) 

According to David Hodgins, a professor of psychology at the University of Calgary, online gambling is considered to be as serious as pathological gambling. It is known as an "isolated disorder" which means that those who have a gambling problem prefer to separate themselves from interruptions and distractions. Because gambling is available online, it increases the opportunity for problem gamblers to indulge in gambling without social influences swaying their decisions. This is why this disorder has become more a problem at this date in time and is why it is so difficult to overcome. The opportunity to gamble online is almost always available in this century opposed to only having the opportunity in a public forum at casinos for example. Online gambling has become quite popular especially with today's adolescents. Today's youth has a greater knowledge of modern software and search engines along with a greater need for extra money. So not only is it easier for them to find opportunities to gamble over any subject, but the incentive to be granted this money is desperately desired.

Internet gaming disorder 

Gaming disorder (colloquially video game addiction) is a known issue around the world. Incidence and severity grew in the 2000s, with the advent of broadband technology, games allowing for the creation of avatars, 'second life' games, and MMORPGs (massive multiplayer online role playing games). World of Warcraft has the largest MMORPG community online and there have been a number of studies about the addictive qualities of the game. Addicts of the game range from children to mature adults. A well-known example is Ryan van Cleave, a university professor whose life declined as he became involved in online gaming. Andrew Doan, a physician with a research background in neuroscience, battled his own addictions with video games, investing over 20,000 hours of playing games over a period of nine years.

Online gaming addiction may be considered in terms of B.F. Skinner's theory of operant conditioning, which claims that the frequency of a given behavior is directly linked to rewarding and punishment of that behavior. If a behavior is rewarded, it is more likely to be repeated. If it is punished, it becomes suppressed.

Orzack, a clinical psychologist at McLean Hospital in Massachusetts claims that 40 percent of World of Warcraft (WoW) players are addicted. Orzack says that the best way to optimize the desired behavior in the subject is to provide rewards for correct behavior, and then adjust the number of times the subject is required to exhibit that behavior before a reward is provided. For instance, if a rat must press a bar to receive food, then it will press faster and more often if it does not know how many times it needs to press the bar. An equivalent in World of Warcraft would be purple (epic) loot drops. Players in World of Warcraft will often spend weeks hunting for a special item which is based on a chance system, sometimes with only a 0.01% chance of it being dropped by a slain monster. The rarity of the item and difficulty of acquiring the item gives the player a status amongst their peers once they obtain the item.

Jim Rossignol, a finance journalist who reports on Internet gaming, has described how he overcame his own addiction and channeled his compulsion into a desirable direction as a reporter of Internet gaming and gaming culture.

Compulsive sexual behaviour disorder (problematic Internet pornography use) 

Universally accepted diagnostic criteria do not exist for pornography addiction or problematic Internet pornography viewing. Pornography addiction is often defined operationally by the frequency of pornography viewing and negative consequences. The only diagnostic criteria for a behavioral addiction in the current Diagnostic and Statistical Manual of Mental Disorders are for pathological gambling, and they are similar to those for substance abuse and dependence, such as preoccupation with the behavior, diminished ability to control the behavior, tolerance, withdrawal, and adverse psychosocial consequences. Diagnostic criteria have been proposed for other behavioral addictions, and these are usually also based on established diagnoses for substance abuse and dependence.

A proposed diagnosis for hypersexual disorder includes pornography as a subtype of this disorder. It included such criteria as time consumed by sexual activity interfering with obligations, repetitive engagement in sexual activity in response to stress, repeated failed attempts to reduce these behaviors, and distress or impairment of life functioning. A study on problematic Internet pornography viewing used the criteria of viewing Internet pornography more than three times a week during some weeks, and viewing causing difficulty in general life functioning.

According to the American Society of Addiction Medicine, some psychological and behavioral changes characteristic of addiction brain changes include addictive cravings, impulsiveness, weakened executive function, desensitization, and dysphoria. BOLD fMRI results have shown that individuals diagnosed with compulsive sexual behavior (CSB) show enhanced cue reactivity in brain regions associated traditionally with drug-cue reactivity. These regions include the amygdala and the ventral striatum. Men without CSB who had a long history of viewing pornography exhibited a less intense response to pornographic images in the left ventral putamen, possibly suggestive of desensitization. ASAMs position is inconsistent with the American Association of Sex Educators, Counselors, and Therapists, who cite lack of strong evidence for such classification, describing ASAM as not informed by "accurate human sexuality knowledge".

Neuropsychopharmacological and psychological research on pornography addiction conducted between 2015 and 2021 have concluded that most studies have been focused entirely or almost exclusively on men in anonymous settings, and the findings are contradicting. Some researches support the idea that pornography addiction qualifies as a form of behavioral addiction into the umbrella construct of hypersexual behavior and/or a subset of compulsive sexual behavior (CSB), and should be treated as such, whereas others have detected the increased activation of ventral striatal reactivity in men for cues predicting erotic but not monetary rewards and cues signaling erotic pictures, therefore suggesting similarities between pornography addiction and conventional addiction disorders.

Some clinicians and support organizations recommend voluntary use of Internet content-control software, internet monitoring, or both, to manage problematic online pornography use. Sex researcher Alvin Cooper and colleagues suggested several reasons for using filters as a therapeutic measure, including curbing accessibility that facilitates problematic behavior and encouraging clients to develop coping and relapse prevention strategies. Cognitive therapist Mary Anne Layden suggested that filters may be useful in maintaining environmental control. Internet behavior researcher David Delmonico stated that, despite their limitations, filters may serve as a "frontline of protection."

Despite the fact that pornography is being highly spuriously indicted as a public health crisis in the United States and elsewhere, with problematic Internet and online pornography use reported to constitute an increasing burden in public mental health since the 2000s, psychopathological models and diagnostic criteria have lacked consensus, and the body of evidence on the effectiveness of therapeutic approaches is still scarce.

Compulsive talking (communication addiction disorder) 

Communication addiction disorder (CAD) is a supposed behavioral disorder related to the necessity of being in constant communication with other people, even when there is no practical necessity for such communication. CAD has been linked to Internet addiction. Users become addicted to the social elements of the Internet, such as Facebook and YouTube. Users become addicted to one-on-one or group communication in the form of social support, relationships, and entertainment. However, interference with these activities can result in conflict and guilt. This kind of addiction is called problematic social media use.

Social network addiction is a dependence of people by connection, updating, and control of their and their friend's social network page. For some people, in fact, the only important thing is to have a lot of friends in the network regardless if they are offline or only virtual; this is particularly true for teenagers as a reinforcement of egos.
Sometimes teenagers use social networks to show their idealized image to the others.  However, other studies claim that people are using social networks to communicate their real personality and not to promote their idealized identity.

Compulsive VR use 

Compulsive VR use (colloquially virtual-reality addiction) is a compulsion to use virtual reality or virtual, immersive environments. Currently, interactive virtual media (such as social networks) are referred to as virtual reality, whereas future virtual reality refers to computer-simulated, immersive environments or worlds. Experts warn about the dangers of virtual reality, and compare the use of virtual reality (both in its current and future form) to the use of drugs, bringing with these comparisons the concern that, like drugs, users could possibly become addicted to virtual reality.

Video streaming addiction 

Video streaming addiction is an addiction to watching online video content, such as those accessed through free online video sharing sites such as YouTube, subscription streaming services such as Netflix, as well as livestreaming sites such as Twitch. The social nature of the internet has a reinforcing effect on the individual's consumption habits, as well as normalizing binge-watching behavior for enthusiasts of particular television series.

Wikipedia addiction 
As of 2016, addiction to Wikipedia has been documented in psychiatry journals.

Risk factors

Interpersonal difficulties 
It is argued that interpersonal difficulties such as introversion, social problems, and poor face-to-face communication skills often lead to internet addiction. Internet-based relationships offer a safe alternative for people with aforementioned difficulties to escape from the potential rejections and anxieties of interpersonal real-life contact.

Social support 
Individuals who lack sufficient social connection and social support are found to run a higher risk of Internet addiction. They resort to virtual relationships and support to alleviate their loneliness. As a matter of fact, the most prevalent applications among Internet addicts are chat rooms, interactive games, instant messaging, or social media. Some empirical studies reveal that conflict between parents and children and not living with mother significantly associated with IA after one year. Protective factors such as quality communication between parents and children and positive youth development are demonstrated, in turn, to reduce the risk of IA.

Psychological factors 
Prior addictive or psychiatric history are found to influence the likelihood of being addicted to the Internet. Some individuals with prior psychiatric problems such as depression and anxiety turn to compulsive behaviors to avoid the unpleasant emotions and situation of their psychiatric problems and regard being addicted to the Internet a safer alternative to substance addictive tendency. But it is generally unclear from existing research which is the cause and which is the effect partially due to the fact that comorbidity is common among Internet addicts.

The most common co-morbidities that have been linked to IAD  are major depression and attention deficit hyperactivity disorder (ADHD). The rate of ADHD and IAD associating is as high as 51.6%.

Internet addicts with no previous significant addictive or psychiatric history are argued to develop an addiction to some of the features of Internet use: anonymity, easy accessibility, and its interactive nature.

Neurobiological factors 
Like most other psychopathological conditions, Internet addiction belongs to the group of multifactorial polygenic disorders. For each specific case, there is a unique combination of inherited characteristics (nervous tissue structure, secretion, degradation, and reception of neuromediators), and many are extra-environment factors (family-related, social, and ethnic-cultural). One of the main challenges in the development of the bio-psychosocial model of Internet addiction is to determine which genes and neuromediators are responsible for increased addiction susceptibility.

Other factors 
Parental educational level, age at first use of the Internet, and the frequency of using social networking sites and gaming sites are found to be positively associated with excessive Internet use among adolescents in some European countries, as well as in the USA.

Diagnosis 
Diagnosis of Internet addiction disorder is empirically difficult. Various screening instruments have been employed to detect Internet addiction disorder. Current diagnoses are faced with multiple obstacles.

Difficulties 
Given the newness of the Internet and the inconsistent definition of Internet addiction disorder, practical diagnosis is far from clear-cut. With the first research initiated by Kimberly S. Young in 1996, the scientific study of Internet addiction has merely existed for more than 20 years. A few obstacles are present in creating an applicable diagnostic method for Internet addiction disorder.
 Wide and extensive use of the Internet: Diagnosing Internet addiction is often more complex than substance addiction as internet use has largely evolved into being an integral or necessary part of human lives. The addictive or problematic use of the internet is thus easily masked or justified. Also, the Internet is largely a pro-social, interactive, and information-driven medium, while other established addiction behaviors such as gambling are often seen as a single, antisocial behavior that has very little socially redeeming value. Many so-called Internet addicts do not experience the same damage to health and relationships that are common to established addictions.
 High comorbidity: Internet addiction is often accompanied by other psychiatric disorders such as personality disorder and intellectual disability. It is found that Internet addiction is accompanied by other DSM-IV diagnosis 86% of the time. In one study conducted in South Korea, 30% of the identified Internet addicts have accompanying symptoms such as anxiety or depression and another 30% have a second disorder such as attention deficit hyperactivity disorder (ADHD). Another study in South Korea found an average of 1.5 other diagnoses among adolescent internet addicts. Further, it is noted in the United States that many patients only resort to medical help when experiencing difficulties they attribute to other disorders. For many individuals, overuse or inappropriate use of the Internet is a manifestation of their depression, social anxiety disorders, impulse control disorders, or pathological gambling. It generally remains unclear from existing literature whether other psychiatric disorders is the cause or manifest of Internet addiction.
Despite the advocacy of categorizing Internet addiction as an established illness, neither DSM-IV (1995) nor DSM-5 (2013) considers Internet addiction as a mental disorder. A subcategory of IAD, Internet gaming disorder is listed in DSM-5 as a condition that requires more research in order to be considered as a full disorder in May 2013. The WHO's draft 11th Revision of the International Classification of Diseases (ICD-11) scheduled for publication in 2018 also include gaming disorder. There is still considerable controversy over whether IAD should be included in the DSM-5 and recognized as a mental disease in general.

Screening instruments 
DSM-based instruments
Most of the criteria utilized by research are adaptations of listed mental disorders (e.g., pathological gambling) in the Diagnostic and Statistical Manual of Mental Disorders (DSM) handbook.

Dr. Ivan K. Goldberg, who first broached the concept of Internet addiction, adopted a few criteria for IAD on the basis of DSM-IV, including “hoping to increase time on the network” and “dreaming about the network.”  By adapting the DSM-IV criteria for pathological gambling, Dr. Kimberly S. Young (1998) proposed one of the first integrated sets of criteria, Diagnostic Questionnaire (YDQ), to detect Internet addiction. A person who fulfills any five of the eight adapted criteria would be regarded as Internet addicted:
 Preoccupation with the Internet;
 A need for increased time spent online to achieve the same amount of satisfaction;
 Repeated efforts to curtail Internet use;
 Irritability, depression, or mood lability when Internet use is limited;
 Staying online longer than anticipated;
 Putting a job or relationship in jeopardy to use the Internet;
 Lying to others about how much time is spent online; and
 Using the Internet as a means of regulating mood.
While Young's YDQ assessment for IA has the advantage of simplicity and ease of use, Keith W. Beard and Eve M. Wolf (2001) further asserted that all of the first five (in the order above) and at least one of the final three criteria (in the order above) be met to delineate Internet addiction in order for a more appropriate and objective assessment.

Young further extended her eight-question YDQ assessment to the now most widely used Internet Addiction Test (IAT), which consists of 20 items with each on a five-point Likert scale. Questions included on the IAT expand upon Young's earlier eight-question assessment in greater detail and include questions such as "Do you become defensive or secretive when anyone asks you what you do online?" and "Do you find yourself anticipating when you go online again?". A complete list of questions can be found in Dr. Kimberly S. Young's 1998 book Caught in the Net: How to Recognize the Signs of Internet Addiction and A Winning Strategy for Recovery and Drs. Laura Widyanto and Mary McMurran's 2004 article titled The Psychometric Properties of the Internet Addiction Test. The Test score ranges from 20 to 100 and a higher value indicates a more problematic use of the Internet:
 20–39 = average Internet users,
 40–69 = potentially problematic Internet users, and
 70–100 = problematic Internet users.
Over time, a considerable number of screening instruments have been developed to diagnose Internet addiction, including the Internet Addiction Test (IAT), the Internet-Related Addictive Behavior Inventory (IRABI), the Chinese Internet Addiction Inventory (CIAI), the Korean Internet Addiction Self-Assessment Scale (KS Scale), the Compulsive Internet Use Scale (CIUS), the Generalized Problematic Internet Use Scale (GPIUS), the Internet Consequences Scale (ICONS), and the Problematic Internet Use Scale (PIUS). Among others, the Internet Addiction Test (IAT) by Young (1998) exhibits good internal reliability and validity and has been used and validated worldwide as a screening instrument.

Although the various screening methods are developed from diverse contexts, four dimensions manifest themselves across all instruments:
 Excessive use: compulsive Internet use and excessive online time-use;
 Withdrawal symptoms: withdrawal symptoms including feelings such as depression and anger, given restricted Internet use;
 Tolerance: the need for better equipment, increased internet use, and more applications/software;
 Negative repercussions: Internet use caused negative consequences in various aspects, including problematic performance in social, academic, or work domains.
More recently, researchers Mark D. Griffiths (2000) and Dr. Jason C. Northrup and colleagues (2015) claim that Internet per se is simply the medium and that the people are in effect addicted to processes facilitated by the Internet. Based on Young's Internet Addiction Test (IAT), Northrup and associates further decompose the internet addiction measure into four addictive processes: Online video game playing, online social networking, online sexual activity, and web surfing. The Internet Process Addiction Test (IPAT) is created to measure the processes to which individuals are addicted.

Screening methods that heavily rely on DSM criteria have been accused of lacking consensus by some studies, finding that screening results generated from prior measures rooted in DSM criteria are inconsistent with each other. As a consequence of studies being conducted in divergent contexts, studies constantly modify scales for their own purposes, thereby imposing a further challenge to the standardization in assessing Internet addiction disorder.

Single-question instruments
Some scholars and practitioners also attempt to define Internet addiction by a single question, typically the time-use of the Internet. The extent to which Internet use can cause negative health consequences is, however, not clear from such a measure. The latter of which is critical to whether IAD should be defined as a mental disorder.

Neuroimaging techniques 
Emergent neuroscience studies investigated the influence of problematic, compulsive use of the internet on the human brain. Following anecdotal reports and the conclusion by Dr. Kimberly S. Young (1998), neuroimaging studies revealed that IAD contributes to structural and functional abnormalities in the human brain, similar to other behavioral and substance additions. Therefore, objective non-invasive neuroimaging can contribute to the preliminary diagnosis and treatment of IAD.

Electroencephalography-based diagnosis
Using electroencephalography (EEG) readings allows identifying abnormalities in the electrical activity of the human brain caused by IAD. Studies revealed that individuals with IAD predominantly demonstrate increased activity in the theta and gamma band and decreased delta, alpha, and beta activity. Following these findings, studies identified a correlation between the differences in the EEG readings and the severity of IAD, as well as the extent of impulsivity and inattention.

Classification 
As many scholars have pointed out, the Internet serves merely as a medium through which tasks of divergent nature can be accomplished. Treating disparate addictive behaviors under the same umbrella term is highly problematic.

Dr. Kimberly S. Young (1999) asserts that Internet addiction is a broad term which can be decomposed into several subtypes of behavior and impulse control problems, namely,
 Cybersexual addiction: compulsive use of adult websites for cybersex and cyberporn (see Internet sex addiction)
 Cyber-relationship addiction: Over-involvement in online relationships
 Net compulsions: Obsessive online gambling, shopping or day-trading
 Information overload: Compulsive web surfing or database searches
 Computer addiction: Obsessive computer game playing (see Video game addiction)

For a more detailed description of related disorders please refer to the related disorders section above.

Treatment
Current interventions and strategies used as treatments for Internet addiction stem from those practiced in substance abuse disorder. In the absence of "methodologically adequate research", treatment programs are not well corroborated. Psychosocial treatment is the approach most often applied. In practice, rehab centers usually devise a combination of multiple therapies.

Psychosocial treatment 
Cognitive behavioral therapy
The cognitive behavioral therapy with Internet addicts (CBT-IA) is developed in analogy to therapies for impulse control disorder.

Several key aspects are embedded in this therapy:
 Learning time management strategies;
 Recognizing the benefits and potential harms of the Internet;
 Increasing self-awareness and awareness of others and one's surroundings;
 Identifying "triggers" of Internet "binge behavior", such as particular Internet applications, emotional states, maladaptive cognitions, and life events;
 Learning to manage emotions and control impulses related to accessing the Internet, such as muscles or breathing relaxation training;
 Improving interpersonal communication and interaction skills;
 Improving coping styles; 
 Cultivating interests in alternative activities.
Three phases are implemented in the CBT-IA therapy:
 Behavior modification to control Internet use: Examine both computer behavior and non-computer behavior and manage Internet addicts' time online and offline;
 Cognitive restructuring to challenge and modify cognitive distortions: Identify, challenge, and modify the rationalizations that justify excessive Internet use;
 Harm reduction therapy to address co-morbid issues: Address any co-morbid factors associated with Internet addiction, sustain recovery, and prevent relapse.

Symptom management of CBT-IA treatment has been found to sustain six months post-treatment.

Motivational interviewing
The motivational interviewing approach is developed based on therapies for alcohol abusers. This therapy is a directive, patient-centered counseling style for eliciting behavior change through helping patients explore and resolve ambivalence with a respectful therapeutic manner. It does not, however, provide patients with solutions or problem solving until patients' decision to change behaviors.

Several key elements are embedded in this therapy:
 Asking open-ended questions;
 Giving affirmations;
 Reflective listening

Other psychosocial treatment therapies include reality therapy, Naikan cognitive psychotherapy, group therapy, family therapy, and multimodal psychotherapy.

Medication 
IAD may be associated with a co-morbidity, so treating a related disorder may also help in the treatment of IAD. When individuals with IAD were treated with certain antidepressants, the time online was reduced by 65% and cravings of being online also decreased. The antidepressants that have been most successful are selective serotonin reuptake inhibitors (SSRIs) such as escitalopram and the atypical antidepressant bupropion. A psychostimulant, methylphenidate, was also found to have beneficial effects. However, the available evidence on treatment of IAD is of very low quality at this time and well-designed trials are needed.

Prevalence 

Different samples, methodologies, and screening instruments are employed across studies.

Terminology 
The notion of "Internet addictive disorder" was initially conjured up by Ivan K. Goldberg in 1995 as a joke to parody the complexity and rigidity of the American Psychiatric Association's (APA) Diagnostic and Statistical Manual of Mental Disorders (DSM). In his first narration, Internet addictive disorder was described as having the symptoms of "important social or occupational activities that are given up or reduced because of Internet use", "fantasies or dreams about the Internet," and "voluntary or involuntary typing movements of the fingers."

The definition of Internet addiction disorder has troubled researchers ever since its inception. In general, no standardized definition has been provided despite that the phenomenon has received extensive public and scholar recognition. Below are some of the commonly used definitions.

In 1998, Jonathan J. Kandell defined Internet addiction as "a psychological dependence on the Internet, regardless of the type of activity once logged on."

English psychologist Mark D. Griffiths (1998) conceived Internet addiction as a subtype of broader technology addiction, and also a subtype of behavioral addictions.

In recent years, the validity of the term "Internet addiction" as a single psychological construct has been criticized. New empirical evidence is emerging to support this view.

Society

Anonymous 12 Step Recovery Programs for Media and Internet Addiction 
1. Internet and Technology Addicts Anonymous (ITAA), founded in 2017, is a 12-step program supporting users coping with the problems resulting from compulsive internet and technology use. Some common sub-addictions include smartphone addiction, binge watching addiction, and social media addiction. There are face-to-face meetings in some cities. Telephone / online meetings take place every day of the week, at various times (and in various languages) that allow people worldwide to attend. Similar to 12-step fellowships such as Overeaters Anonymous, Workaholics Anonymous, or Sex and Love Addicts Anonymous, most members do not define sobriety as avoiding all technology use altogether. Instead, most ITAA members come up with their own definitions of abstinence or problem behaviors, such as not using the computer or internet at certain hours or locations or not going to certain websites or categories of websites that have proven problematic in the past. Meetings provide a source of live support for people, to share struggles and victories, and to learn to better function in life once less of it is spent on problematic technology use.

2. Media Addicts Anonymous (MAA) is a 12-step program focused on recovery from media addiction. All forms of media sobriety are supported, including abstinence from electronic media, films, radio, newspapers, magazines, books, and music.

NoSurf 
The NoSurf Reddit community maintains a list of resources and strategies helpful for people trying to decrease their internet usage. This includes lists of software programs that people use to control which sites they visit and when, as well as a discussion group that takes place on Discord.

Public concern 
Internet addiction has raised great public concern in Asia and some countries consider Internet addiction as one of the major issues that threatens public health, in particular among adolescents.

China 
Internet addiction is commonly referred to as "electronic opium" or "electronic heroin" in China. The government of the People's Republic of China was the first country to formally classify Internet addiction a clinical disorder by recognizing "Clinical Diagnostic Criteria for Internet Addiction" in 2008. The government has enacted several policies to regulate adolescents' Internet use, including limiting daily gaming time to 3 hours and requiring users' identification in online video games.

Mistreatment and abuse in China
In the absence of guidance from China's Health Ministry and a clear definition of Internet addiction, dubious treatment clinics have sprouted up in the country. As part of the treatment, some clinics and camps impose corporal punishment upon patients of Internet addiction and some conducted electroconvulsive therapy (ECT) against patients, the latter of which has caused wide public concern and controversy. Several forms of mistreatment have been well-documented by news reports.

One of the most commonly used treatments for Internet-addicted adolescents in China is inpatient care, either in a legal or illegal camp. It is reported that children were sent to these camps against their will. Some are seized and bound by staff of the camp, some are drugged by their parents, and some are tricked into treatment.

In many camps and clinics, corporal punishment is frequently used in the treatment of Internet addiction disorder. The types of corporal punishment practiced include, but not limited to, kilometers-long hikes, intense squats, standing, starving, and confinement. After physical abuse caused the death of an adolescent at a treatment camp in 2009, the Chinese government officially prohibited the use physical violence in such places. However, multiple cases of abuse and deaths at such facilities continue to be reported.

Among Internet addiction rehab centers that use corporal punishment in treatment, Yuzhang Academy in Nanchang, Jiangxi Province, is the most notorious. In 2017, the academy was accused of using severe corporal punishment against students, the majority of which are Internet addicts. Former students claimed that the academy hit problematic students with iron rulers, "whip them with finger-thick steel cables", and lock students in small cells week long. Several suicidal cases emerged under the great pressure.

In November 2017, the academy stopped operating after extensive media exposure and police intervention.

Electroconvulsive therapy
In China, electroconvulsive therapy (ECT) is legally used for schizophrenia and mood disorders. Its use in treating adolescent Internet addicts has raised great public concern and stigmatized the legal use of ECT.

The most reported and controversial clinic treating Internet addiction disorder is perhaps the Linyi Psychiatric Hospital in Shandong Province. Its center for Internet addiction treatment was established in 2006 by Yang Yongxin. Various interviews of Yongxin Yang confirm that Yang has created a special therapy,  ("brain-waking") therapy, to treat Internet addiction. As part of the therapy, electroconvulsive therapy is implemented with currents of 1–5 milliampere. As Yang put it, the electroconvulsive therapy only involves sending a small current through the brain and will not harm the recipient. As a psychiatric hospital, patients are deprived of personal liberty and are subject to electroconvulsive treatment at the will of hospital staffs. And before admission, parents have to sign contracts in which they deliver their guardianship of kids partially to the hospital and acknowledge that their kids will receive ECT. Frequently, ECT is employed as a punishment method upon patients who breaks any of the center's rules, including "eating chocolate, locking the bathroom door, taking pills before a meal and sitting on Yang's chair without permission". It is reported in a CCTV-12 segment that a DX-IIA electroconvulsive therapy machine is utilized to correct Internet addiction. The machine was, later on, revealed to be illegal, inapplicable to minor and can cause great pain and muscle spasm to recipients. Many former patients in the hospital later on stood out and reported that the ECT they received in the hospital was extremely painful, tore up their head, and even caused incontinence. An Interview of the Internet addiction treatment center in Linyi Psychiatric Hospital is accessible via the following link. Since neither the safety nor the effectiveness of the method was clear, the Chinese Ministry of Health banned electroconvulsive therapy in treating Internet addiction disorder in 2009.

Drug
In Yang's clinic, patients are forced to take psychiatric medication in addition to Jiewangyin, a type of medication invented by himself. Neither the effectiveness nor applicability of the medication has been assessed, however.

Physical abuse and death
At clinics and rehab centers, at least 12 cases of physical abuse have been revealed by media in the recent years including seven deaths.

In 2009, a 15-year-old, Senshan Deng, was found dead eight hours after being sent to an Internet-addiction center in Nanning, Guangxi Province. It is reported that the teenager was beaten by his trainers during his stay in the center.

In 2009, another 14-year-old teenager, Liang Pu, was taken to hospital with water in the lungs and kidney failure after a similar attack in Sichuan Province.

In 2014, a 19-year-old, Lingling Guo, died in an Internet-addiction center with multiple injuries on head and neck in Zhengzhou, Henan Province.

In 2016, after escaping from an Internet addiction rehab center, a 16-year-old girl tied and starved her mother to death in revenge of the being sent to treatment in Heilongjiang Province.

In August 2017, an 18-year-old boy, Li Ao, was found dead with 20 external scars and bruises two days after his parents sent him to a military-style boot camp in Fuyang city, Anhui Province.

South Korea 
Being almost universally connected to the Internet and boasting online gaming as a professional sport, South Korea deems Internet addiction one of the most serious social issues and describes it as a "national crisis". Nearly 80% of the South Korean population have smartphones. According to government data, about two million of the country's population (less than 50 million) have Internet addiction problem, and approximately 680,000 10–19-year-old teenagers are addicted to the Internet, accounting for roughly 10% of the teenage population. Even the very young generation are faced with the same problem: Approximately 40% of South Korean children between age three to five are using smartphones over three times per week. According to experts, if children are constantly stimulated by smartphones during infancy period, their brain will struggle to balance growth and the risk of Internet addiction.

It is believed that due to Internet addiction, many tragic events have happened in South Korea: A mother, tired of playing online games, killed her three-year-old son. A couple, obsessed with online child-raising games, left their young daughter die of malnutrition. A 15-year-old teenager killed his mother for not letting him play online games and then committed suicide. One Internet gaming addict stabbed his sister after playing violent games. Another addict killed one and injured seven others.

In response, the South Korea government has launched the first Internet prevention center in the world, the Jump Up Internet Rescue School, where the most severely addicted teens are treated with full governmental financial aid. As of 2007, the government has built a network of 140 Internet-addiction counseling centers besides treatment programs at around 100 hospitals. Typically, counselor- and instructor-led music therapy and equine therapy and other real-life group activities including military-style obstacle courses and therapeutic workshops on pottery and drumming are used to divert IAs' attention and interest from screens.

In 2011, the Korean government introduced the "Shutdown law", also known as the "Cinderella Act", to prevent children under 16 years old from playing online games from midnight (12:00) to 6 a.m.

Japan 

Many cases of social withdrawal have been occurring in Japan since the late 1990s which inclines people to stay indoors most of the time. The term used for this is hikikomori, and it primarily affects the youth of Japan in that they are less inclined to leave their residences. Internet addiction can contribute to this effect because of how it diminishes social interactions and gives young people another reason to stay at home for longer. Many of the hikikomori people in Japan are reported to have friends in their online games, so they will experience a different kind of social interaction which happens in a virtual space.

See also 

 Addictive personality
 Cyberslacking
 Criticism of Facebook
 Digital addict
 Digital detox
 Digital media use and mental health
 Gaming disorder
 Instagram's impact on people
 List of repetitive strain injury software (i.e. break reminders)
 Media multitasking
 Pornography addiction
 Procrastination
 Psychological effects of Internet use
 Soft addiction
 Terminally online
 Underearners Anonymous
 Workaholic

References

Further reading 

 
 
 
 
 
 
 
 
 
 
 
 
 
 
 
 
 
 
 
 
  
 
 

Digital media use and mental health
Internet culture
Pornography
Behavioral addiction
Human–computer interaction